Blocksom is a surname. Notable people with the surname include:

Augustus P. Blocksom (1854–1931), United States Army general
Patricia Blocksom, Canadian lawyer and arbitrator